Dark City is a 1990 independent film. It was shown at the 1990 Toronto Festival of Festivals, but did not achieve wide release.  The plot concerns the murder of a local politician, and seven people accused of the murder.

External links
 
 

1990 films
British crime drama films
Canadian crime drama films
English-language Canadian films
1990s crime films
1990s English-language films
1990s Canadian films
1990s British films